The men's 800 metres at the 2016 European Athletics Championships took place at the Olympic Stadium on 7, 8, and 10 July.

Records

Schedule

Results

Round 1 

First 3 (Q) and next 4 fastest (q) qualify for the semifinals.

Semifinals 

First 3 (Q) and next 2 fastest (q) qualify for the final.

Final

References

External links
 amsterdam2016.org, official championship site.

800 M
800 metres at the European Athletics Championships